Silvestre Rasuk (born September 5, 1987) is an American actor.

Early life
Rasuk was born in Harlem, New York, the son of Dominican parents. He has one brother, Victor, with whom he co-starred in the 2002 film Raising Victor Vargas.

Career
In the film Rock Steady, Rasuk played a character named Little Stevie. In 2003, he appeared in Spoonful of Sugar as Raul. In 2004, he appeared in an episode of The Jury and Men Without Jobs. He appeared in the 2009 film Toe to Toe as Rashid.

Personal life
Rasuk is a fan of Al Pacino, sushi, and rum.

Filmography
Ernesto (2000): Ernesto
Raising Victor Vargas aka Long Way Home (2002): Nino Vargas
Rock Steady (2002): Little Stevie
Spoonful of Sugar (2003): Raul
The Jury (TV series) (2004): Tim Zerznick
Men Without Jobs (2004): Member of the Nola Darling Fan Club
New Amsterdam (TV series) (2008): Kid
Toe to Toe (2009): Rashid
Law & Order: Special Victims Unit (TV series) (2010): Band Member
Law & Order: Criminal Intent (TV series) (2010): Volunteer #1
Our Idiot Brother (2011): Conflicted Kid on Train
A Gifted Man (2011): Alex Hernandez
The Big C (2012): Male Student
An American in Hollywood (2012): Angelo
Rob the Mob (2014): Homeless Man

Music videos
''Erin Christine - Say,

See also

Lists of people from the Dominican Republic

References

External links

1987 births
American male film actors
American people of Dominican Republic descent
Hispanic and Latino American male actors
Living people
Male actors from New York City
American male television actors
20th-century American male actors
21st-century American male actors
American male child actors
People from Harlem